Hitomaro is a crater on Mercury. It has a diameter of 105 kilometers. Its name was adopted by the International Astronomical Union (IAU) in 1976. Hitomaro is named for the Japanese poet Kakinomoto no Hitomaro, who lived from the 650s to roughly 709.

The impactor that created Hitomaro crater struck the west side of an older and larger peak ring basin (unnamed).  The crater itself is unusual in that its central peak complex is offset to the west. It also possesses a ray system that has two dark lobes to the north and south, and lighter portions to the east and west.  There are also hollows on the crater floor.

Hitomaro is located west of the much larger Sanai crater.  The crater Dvorák is to the northeast of Hitomaro.  Balagtas, Kenkō, and Mahler are to the south.

Views

References

Impact craters on Mercury